Henry Douglas (17 July 1882 – 30 December 1954) was a British sports shooter. He competed in the 600 m free rifle event at the 1924 Summer Olympics.

References

External links
 

1882 births
1954 deaths
British male sport shooters
Olympic shooters of Great Britain
Shooters at the 1924 Summer Olympics
People from Matlock, Derbyshire
Sportspeople from Derbyshire